Latyia was a town in Ainis in ancient Thessaly. It is known from epigraphic evidence.

It is unlocated.

References

Populated places in ancient Thessaly
Former populated places in Greece
Ainis
Lost ancient cities and towns